Alıqulu is a village in the Lachin District of Azerbaijan.

History 
The village was located in the Armenian-occupied territories surrounding Nagorno-Karabakh, coming under the control of ethnic Armenian forces during the First Nagorno-Karabakh War in the early 1990s. The village subsequently became part of the breakaway Republic of Artsakh as part of its Kashatagh Province, referred to as Ghazarapat. It was returned to Azerbaijan as part of the 2020 Nagorno-Karabakh ceasefire agreement.

References 

Villages in Azerbaijan
Populated places in Lachin District